Kofi Aidoo is a Ghanaian writer. He was born in the 1950s at Sagyimase in the Akim Abuakwa Traditional Area of Ghana, where he also began his Elementary Education at Asikwa. The first of nine children born to a senior touring officer at the Ghana Prisons Services; his interests in writing began at a young age writing short stories on his escapades with his father around the country. While studying at Anum Presbyterian Training College, his literary works found their way into the BBC-Africa Service weekly bulletin. 
He studied journalism part-time at the Ghana Institute of Journalism while working as a teacher in Accra, and published his first work Saworbeng, a collection of eleven stories interspersed with lays to mimic the traditional mode of storytelling.

Works 
Saworben: a collection of short stories, Tema: Ghana Publishing Corporation, 1977
Of Men and Ghosts, Ghana Publishing Corporation, 1991. Longman, 1994

References 

1950s births
Living people
Ghanaian writers
University of Maryland, College Park alumni
College of Wooster alumni